Rubus australis, commonly called swamp lawyer, is a climbing plant species found in New Zealand. Its hooked branches allow it to climb across the ground and into shrubs and trees.

R. australis produces yellow- to red-coloured fruit, while small white flowers are produced between October and November. The Māori language name of the plant is tātarāmoa.

References

External links 
 
 
 
 

australis
Flora of New Zealand